Mimation refers to the suffixed   (the letter mem in many Semitic abjads) which occurs in some Semitic languages.

This occurs in Akkadian on singular nouns. It was also present in the Proto-Semitic language.

It is retained in the plural and the few remaining dual forms in Modern Hebrew. It corresponds to the letter nun (-n) in Classical Arabic and is retained in the singular (nunation), dual, and plural.

See also 
 Nunation

References 

Semitic linguistics